The All-Pac-12 men's soccer team is an annual Pac-12 Conference (Pac-12) honor bestowed on the best players in the conference following every college soccer season. Pac-12 coaches select an 11-player first team and a 12-player second team.

Selections

2010–present 

2013

The 2013 teams.

First teamSecond team

References 

All-Pac-12 Teams